Ernakulam Public Library is a public library in Kochi in the state of Kerala, India. Established in 1870, it is the oldest public library in Kerala. The library serves as the most important information store and cultural centre of Ernakulam and has a collection of several books on various subjects. This library contributed a lot to the social and cultural improvements of the city over the past three centuries.

History
Thottakattu Sankunni Menon, Diwan of the Cochin Kingdom presents his idea of a Public Library in Cochin State to Rama Varma XIV, King of Cochin. Based upon this a meeting was held on 8 October 1869 at the school building premises now occupied by Maharaja’s College, Ernakulam. The first president of the library was the principal of the College, A.F. Sealy. The minutes of the meeting says : that a Public Library and Reading Room be established for the benefit of the community. Thus was born, this institution.

Developments
The foundation stone for new building was laid by Sri.C.Achutha Menon, the then chief Minister of Kerala and was inaugurated on 3 March 1974. The second floor was completed in the year 1977 and was inaugurated by Cardinal Joseph Parecattil. The Third Floor which consists of an auditorium was completed in June 1987.

Facilities
 Members room
 Ladies and children’s room
 General reading room
 Auditorium

Membership
The library offers memberships like Institutional Membership, Lifetime Membership, First Class Membership, Second Class Membership and Third Class Membership.

References

Libraries in Kerala
Public libraries in India
Libraries in Ernakulam
Libraries established in 1870